This is a list of the German Media Control Top100 Singles Chart number-ones of 1995.

Number-one hits by week

See also
List of number-one hits (Germany)

References

External links
 Official website Musikmarkt
 Official website Media Control

Number one hits
Germany hits
1995
1995